Tarasenko or Tarasenka is an East Slavic surname. It may refer to:

 Andrey Tarasenko (disambiguation), multiple individuals
 Felix Tarasenko (1932–2021), Russian mathematician
 Kateryna Tarasenko (born 1987), Ukrainian Olympic rower
 Mikhail Tarasenko (born 1947), Russian politician
 Oleh Tarasenko (born 1990), Ukrainian footballer
 Oleksandr Tarasenko (disambiguation), multiple individuals
 Stanislav Tarasenko (born 1966), Russian long jumper
 Tamara Tarasenko (1939–1992), Ukrainian philosopher
 Taras Tarasenko (born 1980), Ukrainian lawyer
 Vadim Tarasenko (born 1994), Russian speedway rider
 Valery Tarasenka (born 1981), Belarusian footballer
 Vasyl Tarasenko (1907–2001), Ukrainian diplomat
 Vladimir Tarasenko (born 1991), Russian ice hockey player
 Yevhen Tarasenko  (born 1983), Ukrainian footballer
 Yuliya Tarasenko (disambiguation), multiple individuals

See also
 

Ukrainian-language surnames